Kurt Blachy (1897–1980) was a German actor and film director.

Selected filmography
 Bismarck 1862–1898 (1927)
 What a Woman Dreams of in Springtime (1929)
 Death Drive for the World Record (1929)
 Roses Bloom on the Moorland (1929)

References

Bibliography

External links

1897 births
1980 deaths
German film directors
German male stage actors
German male film actors
20th-century German male actors